This was the qualification round for MNL-2. This competition had four clubs. Only three qualified to the 2016 MNL-2 and one played for MNL-3.

Qualifying round

(Q) = qualified to play in MNL-2.

Results

First Match

Second Match

Third Match

MNL-2
2016 in Burmese sport
2016 in Burmese football